Nicolás Ramírez may refer to:

 Nicolás Ramírez (Mexican footballer) (born 1974), Mexican former football defensive midfielder
 Nicolás Ramírez (Argentine footballer) (born 1988), Argentine football forward for Deportivo Camioneros
 Nicolás Ramírez (Chilean footballer) (born 1997), Chilean football centre-back for Huachipato

See also
 Nick Ramirez (Nicholas Randolph Ramirez, born 1989), American baseball pitcher